Jennifer Lopez is an American entertainer who has recorded songs in English and Spanish. In addition to recording material for her eight studio albums and two compilation albums, she has also contributed music to film soundtracks, charity records and television advertisements and has collaborated with other recording artists on their respective albums. Lopez, who began her career in musical theater, re-entered the music scene upon her portrayal of the title role in the Selena biopic of the same name (1997). The role inspired her to launch a career in music. She then recorded a demo in Spanish and her manager Benny Medina sent it the Work Group, who showed an interest in signing her. Tommy Mottola, the head of the label, advised her to sing in English instead.

Lopez's debut album, On the 6 (1999), incorporates different parts of Lopez's life and upbringing, and marked the beginning of Lopez exploring the topic of love, a theme she continued to explore throughout her future albums.

Released songs

Unreleased songs

Notes

References 

General
 
 

Specific

 
Lopez, Jennifer